David Bellos (born 1945) is an English-born translator and biographer. Bellos is Meredith Howland Pyne Professor of French Literature and Professor of Comparative Literature at Princeton University in the United States. He was director of Princeton's Program in Translation and Intercultural Communication from its inception in 2007 until July 1, 2019.

Biography

Bellos' research topics have included Honoré de Balzac and Georges Perec. Bellos published a translation of Perec's most famous novel, Life A User's Manual, in 1987.

He won the first Man Booker International Prize for translation in 2005 for his translations of works by Albanian author Ismail Kadare, despite not speaking Albanian. His translations were done from previous French translations.

Bellos has written three literary biographies and an introduction to translation studies, Is That a Fish in Your Ear? Translation and The Meaning of Everything (2011). His most recent book, The Novel of the Century,  tells the story of how Victor Hugo wrote Les Misérables.

He appears in The Magnificent Tati, a documentary about the filmmaker Jacques Tati.

He is the father of writer and broadcaster Alex Bellos.

Awards and honours
2005 Man Booker International Prize, for translation of works by Ismail Kadare
2015 Officier in the Ordre national des Arts et des Lettres
2017 American Library in Paris Book Award winner for The Novel of the Century
2019 Howard T. Berhman Award for Distinguished Achievement in the Humanities, Princeton University

Publications

Translations
Georges Perec: Life A User's Manual, 1987 (French-American Foundation's translation prize); new edition, 2008
Georges Perec: W, or the Memory of Childhood, 1988
Georges Perec: Things: A Story of the Sixties, 1990
Georges Perec: 53 Days, 1992
Ismail Kadare: The Pyramid, 1995
Ismail Kadare:The File on H, 1996
Georges Ifrah: A Universal History of Numbers, 2000
Ismail Kadare: Spring Flowers, Spring Frost, 2001
Fred Vargas: Have Mercy On Us All, 2003
Fred Vargas: Seeking Whom He May Devour, 2004
Ismail Kadare: The Successor, 2005
Ismail Kadare: Agamemnon's Daughter, 2006
Ismail Kadare: The Siege, 2008
Hélène Berr: Journal, 2008
Georges Perec: Thoughts of Sorts, 2009
Romain Gary: Hocus Bogus, 2010
Georges Perec: The Art and Craft of Approaching Your Head of Department to Submit a Request for a Raise, 2011
Georges Simenon: Pietr the Latvian, 2013
Daniel Anselme: On Leave, 2014
Ismail Kadare: Twilight of the Eastern Gods, 2014
Georges Perec: Portrait of a Man, 2014 (UK), 2015 (USA)
Georges Perec: I Remember, 2014 (USA) (with Philip Terry)
Paul Fournel, Dear Reader, 2014 (UK)

Biographies
Georges Perec. A Life in Words, 1993. (Prix Goncourt de la biographie). French edition, 1994. Japanese edition, 2014. Hebrew edition, 2016. New edition in French, forthcoming 2021; German, Turkish and Chinese translations in progress. 
Jacques Tati. His Life and Art, 1999. French edition, 2002
Romain Gary. A Tall Story, Harvill Secker, November 2010

Other books
Balzac Criticism in France, 1850–1900. The Making of a Reputation. Oxford, 1976
La Cousine Bette. A Critical Guide. London, 1981
Old Goriot (Landmarks of World Literature). Cambridge, 1987. Hebrew translation, Tek Aviv, 1990.
Is That a Fish in Your Ear? Translation and the Meaning of Everything. London and New York, 2011. Ariel, 2012. Russian translation by Natalia Shahova, Azbuka, 2019. Traditional Chinese translation, Rye Field, Taipei, 2019
The Novel of the Century: The Extraordinary Adventure of Les Misérables. London and New York, 2017. Korean edition, 2018. Japanese edition, 2018. Chinese edition, forthcoming 2019

References

External links

"I, Translator" by David Bellos, The New York Times (20 March 2010)
Review of Georges Perec: A Life in Words by Alice Kaplan

Review by Michael Hoffmann of Is That a Fish in Your Ear?, The Guardian (22 September 2011)
"Babbling Barbarians: How Translators Keep Us Civilized: A conversation with David Bellos" Ideas Roadshow, 2013

French–English translators
British biographers
Princeton University faculty
1945 births
Place of birth missing (living people)
Living people
The New York Review of Books people
Prix Goncourt de la Biographie winners